Nguyễn Hữu Thị Nhàn (1870–1935), was an empress dowager of Vietnam between 1933–1935. She was the honorary grandmother of emperor Bảo Đại of the Nguyễn dynasty. She was the concubine of emperor Đồng Khánh. She had never been empress consort, but was given the title of empress dowager in her capacity as the grandmother of the emperor.

References

 Truyện kể về các Vương phi, Hoàng hậu nhà Nguyễn - Thi Long, Nhà xuất bản Đà Nẵng.

Nguyễn dynasty empresses dowager
1870 births
1935 deaths